Save the World · Get the Girl is the second album by The King Blues. It was released on 20 October 2008. Four singles were released from the album: "My Boulder", "Let's Hang the Landlord", "Save the World · Get the Girl", and "I Got Love". "I Got Love" reached #96 in the UK Singles Chart. The album has been received very well by fans and critics. The band hoped to make the top 75 on the albums chart starting 27 October; however, the album did not do so, peaking at #113.

The title is taken from the Clash song "Red Angel Dragnet" from their album Combat Rock.

Track listing

Personnel

 Jonny "Itch" Fox – Lead Vocals, Ukulele  
 Jamie Jazz – Guitar, Baritone Ukulele
 Mike 'Fruitbag' Payne – Piano, Guitar, Hammond, Organ, Electric Sitar, Harmonica, Percussion
 Allen Gunby – Drums
 Jonny Rich – Bass
 Jim Parmley – Conga, Timbale
 Peter Miles – Tambourine, Bass, Banjo, Piano, Percussion, Harmonium, Guitar
 Louie Vause – Accordion
 Denmark Street Punk Rock Choir – Group Vocals
 London Folk Punk Mob – Group Vocals
 Homestead Choir – Group Vocals
 Kat Marsh – Vocals
 Peter Young – Drums
 Jim Parmley – Percussion
 Attila the Stockbroker – Fiddle
 All songs written and performed by The King Blues.
 Produced, recorded and mixed by Peter Miles.
 Track 2, 3, 6, 7 and 8 produced by Clive Langer
 'Underneath This Lamppost Light' produced and mixed by Andreas S. Jensen

References

2008 albums
The King Blues albums